The Seirina OUES  (SGB) is an INS/GPS-guided bomb made by Hellenic defense company OMI Ordtech Military Industries. Development began in 1996. The warhead is not part of the kit, but can be supplied.

See also
Mark 81 bomb
Mark 83 bomb
Mark 84 bomb

References

Bombs